This article lists all-time leading ballot leaders achieved in the NBA All-Star Game fan ballot.

Yearly leaders

Multi-time leaders

See also 

List of NBA All-Stars
NBA All-Star Game Most Valuable Player Award

References

National Basketball Association All-Star Game